Čedomir Pavićević (born 23 May 1978) is a Serbian former professional footballer who played as a midfielder.

References

External links

 
 
 

Association football midfielders
Egri FC players
Expatriate footballers in Hungary
First League of Serbia and Montenegro players
FK TSC Bačka Topola players
Nemzeti Bajnokság I players
Nemzeti Bajnokság II players
OFK Beograd players
Pécsi MFC players
Serbia and Montenegro expatriate footballers
Serbia and Montenegro expatriate sportspeople in Hungary
Serbia and Montenegro footballers
Serbian expatriate footballers
Serbian expatriate sportspeople in Hungary
Serbian footballers
Sportspeople from Subotica
Vasas SC players
1978 births
Living people